Syed Hashim Raza Jillani is a Pakistani politician who is member of the Provincial Assembly of Sindh.

Political career
Syed Hashim Raza Jillani contested by-election on 27 January 2019 from constituency PS-94 (Korangi Karachi-III) of Provincial Assembly of Sindh on the ticket of Muttahida Qaumi Movement-Pakistan. He won the election by the majority of 12,559 votes over the runner up Muhammad Ashraf Jabbar Qureshi of Pakistan Tehreek-e-Insaf. He garnered 21,537 votes while Qureshi received 8,978 votes.

References

Living people
Muttahida Qaumi Movement MPAs (Sindh)
Politicians from Sindh
1990 births